Acrocercops strigosa is a moth of the family Gracillariidae. It is known from Quebec and the United States (Kentucky, North Carolina, Maine and Vermont).

The larvae feed on Quercus alba and Quercus prinus. They mine the leaves of their host plant. The mine starts as a white gallery, which suddenly expands into a very large whitish blotch.

References

strigosa
Moths of North America
Moths described in 1914